Aaron Jaffe (born May 16, 1930) is an American politician and lawyer.

Born in Chicago, Illinois, Jaffe went to the Chicago public schools. He went to University of California, Los Angeles and University of Illinois. In 1953, Jaffe received his Juris Doctor degree from DePaul University College of Law and was admitted to the Illinois bar. In 1959, Jaffe moved to Skokie, Illinois. He was involved with the Democratic Party. From 1971 to 1985, Jaffe served in the Illinois House of Representatives. Jaffe also served as Illinois Circuit Court judge for Cook County, Illinois. Jaffe served as a member of the Illinois Gaming Board.

Notes

1930 births
Living people
Politicians from Chicago
People from Skokie, Illinois
University of California, Los Angeles alumni
University of Illinois alumni
DePaul University College of Law alumni
Illinois lawyers
Illinois state court judges
Democratic Party members of the Illinois House of Representatives